Mirando Mrsić (born 14 October 1959) is a Croatian physician and politician who served as a Minister of Labour and Pension System in the centre left Government of Zoran Milanović from 23 December 2011 until 22 January 2016.

Mrsić was born in Split on 14 October 1959. After finishing elementary and high school in Makarska, he enrolled at the Zagreb School of Medicine  from which he graduated in 1983. He received Ph.D. in biomedical sciences in 2000. Mrsić specialized in hematology.

He was the campaign manager of the successful 2009-10 presidential campaign of Ivo Josipović.

Mrsić was expelled from the Social Democratic Party in March 2018. In October 2018, he founded a new political party, the Democrats.

References

1959 births
Living people
Physicians from Split, Croatia
University of Zagreb alumni
Government ministers of Croatia
Representatives in the modern Croatian Parliament
Politicians from Split, Croatia